Bartoszewo refers to the following places in Poland:

 Bartoszewo, Kuyavian-Pomeranian Voivodeship
 Bartoszewo, West Pomeranian Voivodeship